Jajodia is an Indian surname. Notable people with the surname include:

 Dilip Jajodia (born 1944), Indian businessman
 Sandeep Jajodia (born 1966), Indian industrialist
 Sushil Jajodia, American academic

Indian surnames